Carol Gilbert, O.P., (born 1947) is an American Dominican religious sister and anti-nuclear activist.

Life
Born in 1947 in Traverse City, Michigan, Gilbert was the elder of two children. She was raised in a middle class setting. At the age of 18, in 1965, she joined the Dominican Sisters of Grand Rapids. Starting in 1969, Gilbert taught Junior High School students at various schools around Michigan. This lasted until 1977 when she started to teach at the Alternative Learning Center in Saginaw, Michigan. After 10 years of teaching, in 1979, she devoted her career to plowshare activism.

In 1998, Gilbert and four other protesters entered Andrews Air Force Base during the annual Department of Defense Open House and air show. The group banged on a B-52 with hammers and poured their own blood on it. For this, Gilbert spent 6 months in federal prison. In 2000, Gilbert and two other members of her congregation, Sisters Jackie Hudson, O.P., and Ardeth Platte, O.P., illegally entered Peterson Air Force Base and sprinkled blood on a fighter plane. The group was arrested and held in a federal prison until the charges were dropped.

In 2002, the same group of Sisters entered a Minuteman III missile silo in Colorado. Clad in white jump suits emblazoned with "Citizen Weapon Inspection Team," the group drew a cross in their own blood, banged on the silo, and prayed. The Sisters were arrested and left on the ground for three hours. Their protest spilled over into their pre-trial hearing. Clad in full religious habit, the Sisters answered the judge with a nod. At their trial, the presiding judge, Robert E. Blackburn, granted an in limine motion to the prosecutor. This prevented the Sisters from arguing that their actions were legal under international law and the Nuremberg defense. They were sentenced to between 30 and 41 months in prison. Due to their activism, in 2005 and 2006 Gilbert and Platte were labeled as terrorists by the State of Maryland.

See also
Megan Rice
Jackie Hudson

Notes

References and bibliography

1947 births
People from Traverse City, Michigan
Dominican Sisters
American anti–nuclear weapons activists
Roman Catholic activists
Living people
20th-century American Roman Catholic nuns
Catholics from Michigan
Schoolteachers from Michigan
American women educators
21st-century American Roman Catholic nuns